SS Christopher Newport was a Liberty ship built in the United States during World War II. She was named after Christopher Newport, who was an English seaman and privateer.

He made several voyages of supply between England and Jamestown; in 1609, he became Captain of the Virginia Company's new supply ship, which met a hurricane during the Third Supply mission, and was shipwrecked on the archipelago of Bermuda.

Construction
Christopher Newport was laid down on 25 August 1941, under a Maritime Commission (MARCOM) contract, MCE hull 21, by the Bethlehem-Fairfield Shipyard, Baltimore, Maryland; and was launched on 15 February 1942.

History
She was allocated to Calmar Steamship Corporation, on 30 March 1942.

Sinking

Christopher Newport had set out from Baltimore, on her maiden voyage, in June 1942. A large hole was torn in the hull which completely flooded the engine room. One officer and two crewmen were killed and the steering gear destroyed. The rest of the crew abandoned ship. One of her escorts, submarine HMS P614, attempted to scuttle her, but she remained afloat.

References

Bibliography

 
 
 
 
 

 

Liberty ships
Ships built in Baltimore
1942 ships
Ships sunk by German submarines in World War II
World War II shipwrecks in the Arctic Ocean